The Cycling Federation of India is the national governing body of cycle racing in India. It is a member of the UCI and the Asian Cycling Confederation.

Cycling as a sport was introduced in India thanks to the effort of actor and sportsman Jankidas in the mid 1930s. It reached its international level when Jankidas and his manager Swami Jagan Nath participated in the 1938 British Empire Games at Sydney. With the pioneering of these two, Indian cycling was able to secure its affiliation to the National Cyclists' Union of England. A few years later, another stalwart, Sohrab H. Bhoot of Bombay, joined Jankidas to form the National Cyclists' Federation of India in 1946, and they registered this new body with the world governing association, the Union Cycliste Internationale (UCI).

The Cycling Federation of India then sent teams to the Olympic Games, the Asian Games, and major international cycling events – for example, the London Olympics in 1948; the Warsaw-Berlin-Prague Race (the Peace Race) in 1952, 1954, 1955 (where the organisers covered all expenses and so these peace races were cost-free to Indian authorities); and the Tokyo International Championships in 1961.

Gallery

References

External links
 Forum for cycling in Bangalore (cycling capital of India)
 Bangalore Bicycle Championships – official pages of amateur races
 Indian teams at the Olympic Games: 1948, 1952 (Sports-Reference.com)

India
Cycle racing organizations
Sports governing bodies in India
Cycle racing in India
Sports organizations established in 1946
1946 establishments in India
Organisations based in Delhi